The list of Shuowen Jiezi radicals consists of the 540 radicals used to index Shuowen Jiezi, created by lexicographer Xu Shen. The 540 radicals are shown below.

List

Seal script - regular script comparison

Vol. 2

Vol. 3

Vol. 4

Vol. 5

Vol. 6

Vol. 7

Vol. 8

Vol. 9

Vol. 10

Vol. 11

Vol. 12

Vol. 13

Vol. 14

Vol. 15

See also 
 List of Kangxi radicals － a system of 214 components used by the Kangxi dictionary (1716), made under the leadership of the Kangxi Emperor
 List of Unicode radicals － CJK radicals included in the Unicode Standard.
 List of Xinhua Zidian radicals
 Chinese characters description languages － computer and SVG based description of CJK characters
 CJK characters

References

Sources 

 
 《說文解字》, electronic edition - Donald Sturgeon
 《说文解字注》 全文检索 - 许慎撰 段玉裁注, facsimile edition
 Shuowenjiezi.com, by the CRLAO research institut, Paris, France.

Chinese dictionaries
Chinese calligraphy
Chinese characters